The men's long jump at the 2022 World Athletics Championships was held at the Hayward Field in Eugene on 15 and 16 July 2022. 34 athletes from 21 nations entered to the competition.

Summary

The first round ended with nobody jumping over 8 metres. Indian record holder Murali Sreeshankar, using the mononymous "Sreeshankar", held the lead at 7.96m. In the second round, Steffin McCarter was the first over 8 with an 8.04m to open the floodgate. After a Sreeshankar foul, Olympic Champion Miltiadis Tentoglou blasted an 8.30m to take over the lead as three more competitors achieved jumps over 8 meters -  Marquis Dendy with 8.02m, Maykel Massó with 8.15m, and finally Simon Ehammer with 8.16m. Midway through the third round, Wang Jianan joined the group with an 8.03m. Tentoglou jumped further than all competitors in every round, improving to 8.32m in the fifth round, but the order of the top 8 remained unchanged.

Records
Before the competition records were as follows:

Qualification standard
The standard to qualify automatically for entry was 8.22 m.

Schedule
The event schedule, in local time (UTC−7), was as follows:

Results

Qualification 
The qualification round took place on 15 July, in two groups, both starting at 18:00. Athletes attaining a mark of at least 8.15 metres ( Q ) or at least the 12 best performers ( q ) qualified for the final. The overall results were as follows:

Final 
The final took place on 16 July and started at 18:20. The results were as follows:

References

Long jump
Long jump at the World Athletics Championships